Shelter of Our Most Holy Lady Church is an Eastern Orthodox church in Riga, the capital of Latvia. The church is situated at the address 3 Mēness Street.

References

Churches in Riga